Elijah Solomon Tremelling (8 May 1887 – December 1960) was an English professional footballer who played as a centre half.

Early and personal life
Tremelling was born in Newhall, Derbyshire, on 8 May 1887. His brothers Dan and Billy were also footballers, as was a fourth brother, Jack. His son Arthur was also a footballer.

Career
Tremelling spent his early career with Newhall Swifts, Derby County, Burton United, Ilkeston United, Gresley Rovers and Shirebrook Forest. He joined Bradford City in March 1913, making 2 league appearances for the club. He signed for Bradford City along with fellow Gresley players Charlie Storer and George Draycott for a combined fee of £150. He guested for Chesterfield Town, Notts County and Lincoln City during World War One, both from parent club Bradford City. After leaving Bradford City he played for Mansfield Town in August 1919.

He died in December 1960.

Sources

References

1887 births
1960 deaths
English footballers
Newhall Swifts F.C. players
Derby County F.C. players
Burton United F.C. players
Ilkeston United F.C. players
Gresley F.C. players
Bradford City A.F.C. players
Chesterfield F.C. wartime guest players
Notts County F.C. wartime guest players
Lincoln City F.C. wartime guest players
Mansfield Town F.C. players
English Football League players
Association football defenders
People from Newhall, Derbyshire
Footballers from Derbyshire